Tsotne Badrievich Rogava (born 2 May 1993) is a Ukrainian heavyweight Muay Thai kickboxer, fighting out of the Captain Odessa gym in Odessa. He is the current ACB Kickboxing Heavyweight champion and the 2012 Tatneft Arena World Cup winner.

Career
On October 20, 2012, he beat Zinedine Hameur-Lain in the semifinals and Vladimir Toktasynov in the finals by decision to win the Tatneft Cup 2012.

He lost to Vitor Miranda by unanimous decision in the first round of the Tatneft Cup 2013 on February 23, 2013.

Rogava faced Paul Slowinski in a match for the vacant WMC World Super Heavyweight (+95 kg/209 lb) Championship at Monte Carlo Fighting Masters 2014 in Monte Carlo, Monaco on June 14, 2014, losing by unanimous decision.

In 2016, during Kunlun Fight 52, Rogava took part in the KLF Heavyweight tournament. He beat Asihati by a first-round KO in the semifinals, but lost to Andrey Gerasimchuk by an extra round decision in the finals.

He was scheduled to fight Jhonata Diniz for the Absolute Championship Akhmat Heavyweight Kickboxing title. Rogava beat Diniz by unanimous decision.

Rogava participated in the 2018 FEA World Heavyweight Grand Prix. In the semifinals, he defeated Daniel Lentie by a first-round TKO. In the finals, Tsotne faced Roman Kryklia. The fight went into an extra fourth round, after which Kryklia won a decision.

Titles

Professional
Absolute Championship Berkut
2018 ACB KB Heavyweight Champion
Kunlun Fight
 2016 Kunlun Fight 100+ kg 2016 Tournament Runner-Up
Tatneft Cup 
 2012 Tatneft Arena World Cup (+91 kg) champion.

Amateur
International Federation of Muaythai Associations
 2018 IFMA World muay-thai championship in Cancún, Mexico,  +91 kg
 2017 IFMA World muay-thai championship in Minsk, Belarus,  +91 kg
 2015 IFMA World muay-thai championship  +91 kg
 2013 IFMA Europe muay-thai  +91 kg
 2012 IFMA World muay-thai championship in Saint-Petersburg, Russia  +91 kg
 2012 IFMA Europe muay-thai  +91 kg
 2011 IFMA World muay-thai championship  -91 kg
 2010 SportAccord World Combat Games Muaythai 3rd place  91 kg
 2010 IFMA World muay-thai championship  -91 kg
 2010 Ukraine muay-thai championship  +91 kg
 2009 IFMA World muay-thai championships in Bangkok, Thailand  -91 kg
 2009 Ukraine muay-thai championship  +91 kg
 2009 IFMA Europe muay-thai championship  (juniors) +91 kg

Muay Thai and Kickboxing record

|-
|-  style="background:#fbb;"
| 2018-10-06|| Loss ||align=left| Roman Kryklia || FEA World Grand Prix, Finals|| Moldova || Extra Round Decision (Unanimous)|| 4 || 3:00
|-
! scope="row" style="background:white" colspan=9 | 
|-
|-  style="background:#cfc;"
| 2018-10-06|| Win||align=left| Daniel Lentie || FEA World Grand Prix, Semi Finals|| Moldova || TKO|| 1 ||
|-  style="background:#cfc;"
| 2018-04-20 || Win ||align=left| Jhonata Diniz || ACB KB 15: Grand Prix Kitek || Moscow, Russia || Decision || 5 || 3:00
|-
! style=background:white colspan=9 |
|-
|-  style="background:#cfc;"
| 2017-07-15|| Win ||align=left| Vladimir Toktasynov|| ACB KB 10: Russia vs. China || Moscow, Russia || KO (Left High Scissor Knee)|| 3 || 1:00
|-
|-  style="background:#cfc;"
| 2016-12-23 || Win ||align=left| Su Shaobin || Wu Fight|| Foshan, Guangdong, China || KO || 2 || 
|-
|-  style="background:#cfc;"
| 2016-11-11 || Win ||align=left| Thomas Vanneste || Tatneft Cup 2016 final || Kazan, Russia || Decision (Unanimous) || 4 || 3:00
|-
|-  style="background:#fbb;"
| 2016-09-11 || Loss ||align=left| Andrey Gerasimchuk|| Kunlun Fight 52 100+ kg 2016 Tournament Final || China ||Extra Round Decision || 4 || 3:00
|-
! style=background:white colspan=9 |
|-  style="background:#cfc;"
| 2016-09-11 || Win ||align=left|  Asihati|| Kunlun Fight 52 100+ kg 2016 Tournament Semi-Finals || China || KO (Left High Knee) || 1 || 
|-  style="background:#cfc;"
| 2016-06-25 || Win ||align=left| Kirk Krouba || Kunlun Fight 46 || Kunming, China || TKO (punches) || 1 || 

|-  style="background:#cfc;"
| 2015-10-03 || Win ||align=left| Andrey Okhotnik || Kick & Win || Kiev, Ukraine || TKO  || 3 || 

|-  style="background:#fbb;"
| 2014-06-14 || Loss ||align=left| Paul Slowinski || Monte Carlo Fighting Masters 2014 || Monte Carlo, Monaco || Decision (unanimous) || 5 || 3:00
|-
! style=background:white colspan=9 |
|-  style="background:#fbb;"
| 2014-03-19 || Loss ||align=left| Stefan Anđelković || Tatneft Arena World Cup 2014 fourth selection 1/8 final (+91 kg) || Kazan, Russia || Ext. R. Decision (Unanimous) || 4 ||3:00
|-  style="background:#fbb;"
| 2013-02-23 || Loss ||align=left| Vitor Miranda || Tatneft Arena World Cup 2013 fourth selection 1/8 final (+91 kg) || Kazan, Russia || Decision (Unanimous) || 4 ||3:00
|-  style="background:#cfc;"
| 2012-10-20 || Win ||align=left| Vladimir Toktasynov || Tatneft Arena World Cup 2012 final (+91 kg) || Kazan, Russia || Decision (Unanimous) || 4 || 3:00
|-
! style=background:white colspan=9 |
|-  style="background:#cfc;"
| 2012-07-19 || Win ||align=left| Zinedine Hameur-Lain || Tatneft Arena World Cup 2012 1/2 final (+91 kg) || Kazan, Russia || Decision || 3 || 3:00
|-  style="background:#fbb;"
| 2012-07-07 || Loss ||align=left| Kostadin Kostov || SuperKombat World Grand Prix III 2012, Semi Finals || Varna, Bulgaria || Decision (Split) || 3 || 3:00
|-  style="background:#cfc;"
| 2012-06-02 || Win ||align=left| Yassin Bouanan || Tatneft Arena World Cup 2012 second selection 1/4 final (+91 kg) || Kazan, Russia || KO || 2 ||
|-  style="background:#cfc;"
| 2012-01-21 || Win ||align=left| Tsutomu Takahagi || Tatneft Arena World Cup 2012 second selection 1/8 final (+91 kg) || Kazan, Russia || TKO || 3 ||
|-  style="background:#cfc;"
| 2011-12-17 || Win ||align=left| Zhang Chang || Kungfu VS Muay Thai || Foshan, China || Decision (Unanimous) || 5 || 3:00
|-  style="background:#fbb;"
| 2011-11-17 || Loss ||align=left| Stefan Leko || SuperKombat: Fight Club, Quarter Finals || Oradea, Romania || Ext. R Decision (Split) || 4 || 3:00
|-  style="background:#fbb;"
| 2010-10-22 || Loss ||align=left| Ismael Londt || Tatneft Arena World Cup 2010 second selection 1/4 final (+91 kg) || Kazan, Russia || Ext R. Decision (Unanimous) || 4 || 3:00
|-  style="background:#cfc;"
| 2010-03-05 || Win ||align=left| Roman Nesterenko || Tatneft Arena World Cup 2010 fourth selection 1/8 final (+80 kg) || Kazan, Russia || TKO || 2 || 
|-
| colspan=9 | Legend:    

|-  style="background:#cfc;"
| 2018-05-19|| Win ||align=left| Kiril Kornilov || IFMA World Championship 2018, Final || Cancun, Mexico || Decision (30:27)|| 3 || 3:00 
|-
! style=background:white colspan=9 |

|-  style="background:#cfc;"
| 2018-05-19|| Win ||align=left| Buğra Tugay Erdoğan || IFMA World Championship 2018, Semi Final || Cancun, Mexico || Decision (Unanimous) || 3 ||  3:00

|-  style="background:#cfc;"
| 2018-05-19|| Win ||align=left| Michal Reissinger || IFMA World Championship 2018, Quarter Final || Cancun, Mexico || TKO (Outclassed) ||  ||

|-  style="background:#cfc;"
| 2017-03-14|| Win ||align=left| Iraj Azizpour || IFMA World Championship 2017, Final || Minsk, Belarus || Decision (30:27)|| 3 || 3:00 
|-
! style=background:white colspan=9 |

|-  style="background:#cfc;"
| 2017-03-10|| Win ||align=left| Simon Ogolla || IFMA World Championship 2017, Semi Final || Minsk, Belarus || Decision (30:27)  || 3 || 3:00 

|-  style="background:#cfc;"
| 2017-03-07|| Win ||align=left| Michal Reissinger|| IFMA World Championship 2017, Quarter Final || Minsk, Belarus || RSCO  || 2 ||

|-  style="background:#cfc;"
| 2017-03-05|| Win ||align=left| Sayuli Hamdi|| IFMA World Championship 2017, 1/8 Final || Minsk, Belarus || KO || 1 ||  

|-  style="background:#fbb;"
| 2016-05-28|| Loss|| align=left| Andrey Gerasimchuk|| 2016 IFMA World Championships, Final || Jonkoping, Sweden || Decision || 3|| 3:00 
|-
! style=background:white colspan=8 |

|-  style="background:#cfc;"
| 2016-05-28|| Win|| align=left| Kirill Kornilov || 2016 IFMA World Championships, Semi Final || Jonkoping, Sweden || Decision || 3|| 3:00 

|-  style="background:#fbb;"
| 2015-08- || Loss|| align=left| Kirill Kornilov || 2015 IFMA World Championships, Semi Final || Bangkok, Thailand || Decision || 3||3:00  
|-
! style=background:white colspan=8 |

|-  style="background:#cfc;"
| 2015-08- || Win || align=left| Mustafa Kucik || 2015 IFMA World Championships, Quarter Final || Bangkok, Thailand || TKO || 1||  

|-  style="background:#cfc;"
| 2013-07-|| Win ||align=left| Lubos Rauser || 2013 IFMA European Championship, Final || Lisbon, Portugal || Decision  || 4 || 2:00
|-
! style=background:white colspan=8 |

|-  style="background:#cfc;"
| 2013-07-|| Win ||align=left| Semen Shelepov || 2013 IFMA European Championship, Semi Final || Lisbon, Portugal || Decision  || 4 || 2:00

|-  style="background:#cfc;"
| 2013-07-|| Win ||align=left| Simon Ogolla || 2013 IFMA European Championship, Quarter Final || Lisbon, Portugal || Decision  || 4 || 2:00 

|-  style="background:#cfc;"
| 2012-09-13|| Win ||align=left| Bokan Andrei || 2012 IFMA World Championship, Final || Saint Petersburg, Russia || Decision  || 4 || 2:00 
|-
! style=background:white colspan=9 |
|-  style="background:#cfc;"
| 2012-09-11|| Win ||align=left| Semen Shelepov  || 2012 IFMA World Championship, Semi Finals|| Saint Petersburg, Russia || Decision  || 4 || 2:00

|-  style="background:#cfc;"
| 2012-09-10|| Win ||align=left| Jobirbek Tashpulatov || 2012 IFMA World Championship, Quarter Finals|| Saint Petersburg, Russia || Decision  || 4 || 2:00

|-  style="background:#cfc;"
| 2012-05-|| Win ||align=left| Alexey Kudin || IFMA European Championship 2012, Final || Antalya, Turkey || Decision  || 4 || 2:00 
|-
! style=background:white colspan=9 |

|-  style="background:#cfc;"
| 2012-05-|| Win ||align=left| Alexander Vezehvatov || IFMA European Championship 2012, Semi Final || Antalya, Turkey || Decision  || 4 || 2:00 

|-  style="background:#cfc;"
| 2012-05-|| Win ||align=left| Razvan Ghita || IFMA European Championship 2012, Quarter Final || Antalya, Turkey || Decision  || 4 || 2:00 

|-  bgcolor="#fbb"
| 2011-09-25 || Loss ||align=left| Franc Grajs	|| I.F.M.A. World Championships 2011, Semi Final || Tashkent, Uzbekistan || Decision || 4 || 2:00 
|-
! style=background:white colspan=9 |
|-  style="background:#cfc;"
| 2011-09-22|| Win ||align=left| Makav Dzhavatkhak || 2011 IFMA World Championships, Quarter Finals || Tashkent, Uzbekistan || Decision || 4 || 2:00

|-  style="background:#fbb;"
| 2011-05-||Loss||align=left| Dzianis Hancharonak|| 2011 IFMA European Championships|| Antalya, Turkey || Decision || 4 || 2:00

|-  style="background:#fbb;"
| 2010-12- || Loss ||align=left| Ondřej Hutník || 2010 I.F.M.A. World Muaythai Championships, Semi Finals || Bangkok, Thailand || Decision || 4 || 2:00
|-
! style=background:white colspan=9 |

|-  style="background:#cfc;"
| 2010-12- || Win ||align=left| Zhazio Mirzamuhamedov || 2010 I.F.M.A. World Muaythai Championships, Quarter Finals || Bangkok, Thailand || Decision || 4 || 2:00

|-  bgcolor="#fbb"
| 2010-09- || Loss ||align=left| Wang Wenzhong|| 2010 World Combat Games, Semi Final || Beijing, China || Decision || 4 || 2:00 
|-
! style=background:white colspan=9 |

|-  bgcolor="#cfc"
| 2010-09- || Win||align=left| Semen Shelepov || 2010 World Combat Games, Quarter Final || Beijing, China || Decision || 4 || 2:00 

|-  style="background:#fbb;"
| 2009-12-||Loss||align=left| Dzianis Hancharonak|| 2009 IFMA World Championships, Final || Bangkok, Thailand || Decision || 4 || 2:00
|-
! style=background:white colspan=9 |

|-  style="background:#cfc;"
| 2009-12-|| Win ||align=left| Abdoulie Joof || 2009 IFMA World Championships, Semi Final || Bangkok, Thailand || Decision || 4 || 2:00
|-
| colspan=9 | Legend:

Exhibition boxing record 

| style="text-align:center;" colspan="8"|1 Wins,  1 Losses, 0 Draws
|-  style="text-align:center; background:#e3e3e3;"
|  style="border-style:none none solid solid; "|Res.
|  style="border-style:none none solid solid; "|Record
|  style="border-style:none none solid solid; "|Opponent
|  style="border-style:none none solid solid; "|Type
|  style="border-style:none none solid solid; "|Rd., Time
|  style="border-style:none none solid solid; "|Date
|  style="border-style:none none solid solid; "|Location
|  style="border-style:none none solid solid; "|Notes
|- align=center
|Loss||1–1||align=left| Ali Baghouz
|||||
|align=left|
|align=left|
|- align=center
|Win||1-0||align=left| Tiberiu Porcoi
|||||
|align=left|
|align=left|

See also
List of male kickboxers

References

1993 births
Living people
Ukrainian people of Georgian descent
Ukrainian male kickboxers
Heavyweight kickboxers
Ukrainian Muay Thai practitioners
Ukrainian male boxers
Kunlun Fight kickboxers
SUPERKOMBAT kickboxers
Boxers at the 2020 Summer Olympics
Olympic boxers of Ukraine